Katharine Blunt (May 28, 1876 – July 29, 1954) was an American chemist, professor, and nutritionist who specialized in the fields of home economics, food chemistry and nutrition. Most of her research was on nutrition, but she also made great improvements to research on calcium and phosphorus metabolism and on the basal metabolism of women and children. She served as the third president of Connecticut College.

Early life and education
Katharine Blunt was born on May 28, 1876, in Philadelphia, Pennsylvania, the eldest of three daughters of Stanhope and Fanny (née Smyth) Blunt. The geologist Charles Henry Smyth, Jr., was a first cousin.

Blunt attended The Porter School in Springfield, Massachusetts, then later enrolled in Vassar College, and studied chemistry. In 1898, she received a Bachelor of Arts degree and was elected to Phi Beta Kappa. After four years at home, she enrolled in the Massachusetts Institute of Technology (MIT) in 1902. Blunt received her Ph.D in organic chemistry from the University of Chicago in 1907.

Career

Leadership
For one year Blunt was an instructor in chemistry at Pratt Institute in Brooklyn, New York, then returned to Vassar College in 1908 as an instructor in chemistry. In 1913, Blunt left Vassar again, this time for a position as an assistant professor in the department of home economics at the University of Chicago. She was later promoted to associate professor in 1918 and eventually became a full professor and chair of the Home Economics department in 1925. While she was the chair, the department grew to seventeen staff members and produced researchers, administrators, and nutritionists.

Blunt was concerned that home economics would not become an established profession, so she worked to make it an appropriate subject of instruction and to plan a scientific curriculum for training professionals. In 1928, the American Home Economics Association observed that Blunt's administration had enhanced the quality of graduate work in the field, and that her own devotion to research had provided an invaluable example to students. In 1930, Blunt served as an editor of the University of Chicago's Home Economics Series, before becoming president of Connecticut College.

Connecticut College
In 1929, Blunt was named the third, and first woman to serve as president of Connecticut College for Women, a four-year liberal arts college. As president, Blunt made improvements which led to the college's accreditation in 1932. In her fifteen years as president, dormitories, the student body and faculty had increased. The curriculum was transformed. Blunt acquired endowments, scholarships, and fellowships. In 1934, the Connecticut College Arboretum opened and in 1939, Palmer Auditorium was established. In 1943, she retired, aged 67, but was recalled as president in 1945 at the request of the Board of Trustees. Blunt served in that position for another year.

Scholarship and research
From 1917–18, Blunt worked for the United States Department of Agriculture and the Food Administration, preparing pamphlets on food conservation. The pamphlets were later published as the textbook Food and the War. While writing these pamphlets, Blunt continued to publish articles on food chemistry and nutrition in scholarly journals. The publication of Ultra-Violet Light and Vitamin D in Nutrition, a summary of research in the field, written with Ruth Cowan was published in 1930. During this time, she published writings on the education of women. Blunt believed that "the days of confining college education to the campus are over", and that women "with their belief in the force of education and their fresh political energy, can do much to serve the democracy which has helped them."

Death
After Blunt retired from Connecticut College, she traveled extensively and later died of a pulmonary embolism on July 29, 1954, while recovering from a broken hip. She was buried two days later, on July 31, 1954, in Springfield, Massachusetts.

Publications
 Blunt, Katharine & Bertram, E. Mary (1936). The Losses of Calcium in Cooking Kale. Oregon: Oregon State Agricultural College
 
 Blunt, Katharine & Moore, C. (1923). Experimental Studies of the A Vitamin: Some Clinical and Anatomic Effects in Puppies and Rats. Portland, Oregon

Awards and honors
 1905-06 The Mary Richardson and Lydia Pratt Babbott Fellowship, 1905-06
 1936 Doctors of Laws, Wesleyan University
 1937 Doctors of Laws, Mt. Holyoke College
 1943 Doctors of Laws, Connecticut College
 1941 Outstanding Graduate, University of Chicago
 1949 Citizenship Award, Men's club of Congregation Beth El.
 1952 Citizenship Award, Connecticut Grand lodge, Sons of Italy 
 1954 member, American Chemical Society
 1954 fellow, American Association for the Advancement of Science

Legacy
When Blunt died, she left an apartment building at 640 Williams Street to Connecticut College. In 1946, it was announced that one of the new dormitories at Connecticut College was to be named in Blunt's honor. Katharine Blunt House (most often referred to as "KB") is located in the North Campus of dorms at the College and houses students of all genders and class years.

References

External links
 
 

1876 births
1954 deaths
Home economists
American philanthropists
American women chemists
20th-century American chemists
20th-century American women scientists
Scientists from Philadelphia
Place of death missing
Connecticut College faculty
Burials in Massachusetts
American women academics